Sixth in Sixes is the second studio album by the rock band XBXRX. It was released in 2005 through Polyvinyl Records. The follow-up to 2001's Gop Ist Minee, the record quickly earned underground acclaim and gained such notable fans as Peaches and  Sonic Youth.

Track listing
All songs by XBXRX
"Paradosis" – 0:15
"Deaf Ears, Silent Voice" – 1:32
"Gold Cross" – 1:52
"Regret" – 1:25
"Fabricated Progression" – 1:05
"Hope Until We Can't" – 1:23
"Euphoria" – 0:31
"The End of Quitting" – 0:53
"Deceiver's Voice" – 1:31
"Beat Rolls On" – 2:21
"Pigs Wear Blue" – 1:28
"Sixth Extinction" – 1:16
"Breathing" – 1:29
"Against the Odds" – 1:54
"Self Indulgent" – 0:56
"Self Concept" – 1:48
"Make Force" – 1:11
"In Memory of Our Lives" – 2:46

2005 albums
XBXRX albums